The Blonde Carmen is a 1935 German musical comedy film directed by Victor Janson and starring Mártha Eggerth, Wolfgang Liebeneiner, and Ida Wüst. It is part of the tradition of operetta films. It was shot at the Johannisthal Studios in Berlin. The film's sets were designed by the art directors Wilhelm Depenau and Erich Zander. It was distributed by Rota-Film, a subsidiary of the large Tobis Film concern.

Synopsis
A Hungarian opera star from Budapest decides to take a holiday in the Bavarian Alps. While there she pretends to be a simple peasant girl.

Cast

References

Bibliography

External links 
 

1935 musical comedy films
German musical comedy films
1935 films
Films of Nazi Germany
1930s German-language films
Films directed by Victor Janson
Operetta films
Films set in Bavaria
Films set in the Alps
Cine-Allianz films
Tobis Film films
German black-and-white films
1930s German films
Films shot at Johannisthal Studios